Harrow Airport  is located  east northeast of Harrow, Ontario, Canada.

References

Registered aerodromes in Ontario